Wiggins is an unincorporated community in Leake County, Mississippi.

References

Unincorporated communities in Leake County, Mississippi